Waldemar Bernatzky (28 September 1920 – 2005) was a Uruguayan cyclist. He competed in three events at the 1948 Summer Olympics.

References

External links
 

1920 births
2005 deaths
People from Nueva Helvecia
Uruguayan male cyclists
Olympic cyclists of Uruguay
Cyclists at the 1948 Summer Olympics